Montebello Unified School District is a school district based in Montebello, California, United States.

Montebello USD serves the city of Montebello, portions of the cities of Bell Gardens, Commerce, Downey, Monterey Park, Pico Rivera, Rosemead, and a part of the unincorporated community of East Los Angeles as well as the unincorporated community of South San Gabriel. A portion of Bell lies within the district limits, but it has no residents.

Board of Education

Montebello Unified School District's Board of Education election is held on a Tuesday after the first Monday in November of even-numbered years. The election is a plurality election and board of education members are elected to a four-year term.

References

External links

 Montebello USD

School districts in Los Angeles County, California
Montebello, California
Commerce, California
Monterey Park, California